The National Defence College of Thailand or NDC is an education organization that provides advanced training for both senior military officers and civilians.  It is operated by the Royal Thai Armed Forces of the Thai Ministry of Defence.

History
The NDC was founded in on 2 February 1955 by Field Marshal Plaek Phibunsongkhram by opening the study for top executives of the military and civilian sectors only. Later in 1989, the National Defense Course for the Joint State-Private Sector was opened so that business executives at the level of business owners or executives have been educated with senior executives of the government. In 2003, opened the National Defense Course for national, private, and political by accepting more politicians. Currently, this course is not open to study. With the requirements of those who will be considered for this study if being a civil servant must be a high-level director or equivalent or higher, If being a military officer must have a rank of Colonel, Captain, Group Captain up and if being a police officer must have a Police Colonel rank.

Notable alumni
NDC alumni have dominated the military and political fields of Thailand since the establishment of the College.  Prominent alumni include military dictator Field Marshal Thanom Kittikachorn (Class 1), Prime Minister Sanya Dharmasakti (Class 1), Supreme Commander Serm Na Nakhon (Class 4), Supreme Commander and ISOC Commander Sayud Kerbphol (Class 5), military dictator Kriangsak Chomanan (Class 5), and Privy Council president Prem Tinsulanonda (Class 9), Council for National Security President Sonthi Boonyaratglin (Class 42), Assistant CNS Secretary-General Saprang Kalayanamitr (Class 43), and the current and 50th Commissioner of the Metropolitan Police Bureau Phukphong Phongpetra (Class 59).

See also
Royal Thai Army

References

Further reading
 Website of the National Defence College

Educational institutions established in 1955
Military academies of Thailand
Education in Bangkok
Colleges in Thailand
1955 establishments in Thailand